The House of Representatives was the lower chamber of Fiji's Parliament from 1970 to 2006.  It was the more powerful of the two chambers; it alone had the power to initiate legislation (the Senate, by contrast, could amend or veto most legislation, but could not initiate it).  The House of Representatives also had much greater jurisdiction over financial bills; the Senate could not amend them, although it might veto them.  Except in the case of amendments to the Constitution, over which a veto of the Senate was absolute, the House of Representatives might override a Senatorial veto by passing the same bill a second time, in the parliamentary session immediately following the one in which it was rejected by the Senate, after a minimum period of six months.

Also, the Prime Minister and Cabinet were required to retain the confidence of a majority of the House of Representatives to remain in office.

The House of Representatives was suspended by the 2006 military coup. The 2013 Constitution abolished it and replaced it with a single chamber Parliament.

History 
The House of Representatives dated from 10 October 1970, when Fiji attained independence from the United Kingdom.  Under a grandfather clause in the 1970 Constitution, the old Legislative Council, which had functioned in various forms since 1904, was renamed the House of Representatives and continued in office until 1972, when the first post-independence elections were held. Membership of the House of Representatives was increased from 36 to 52 in 1972, and to 70 in 1992.  By the time of its suspension and abolition it had 71 members, all of whom were elected for five-year terms to represent single-member constituencies.

Electoral system 
 See main articles: Electoral system of Fiji, Voting system of Fiji

The electoral system was changed a number of times after independence in an effort to meet the competing demands of Fiji's diverse ethnic communities.  In elections from 1972 through 1987, Fiji was divided into communal and national constituencies.  The former were elected by voters registered as members of specific ethnic groups (12 indigenous Fijians, 12 Indo-Fijians, and 3 General electors – Caucasians, Chinese, and other minorities); the latter were allocated to specific ethnic groups (10 indigenous Fijians, 10 Indo-Fijians, and 5 General Electors), but elected by universal suffrage.  The system was a compromise between indigenous demands for a strictly communal franchise (based on fears of being swamped by an Indo-Fijian block-vote) and Indo-Fijian calls for universal suffrage, and was never widely popular.  Ethnic Fijian nationalists blamed the national constituencies for the election of an Indo-Fijian dominated government in 1987, and following two military coups, they were abolished by the new republican Constitution of 1990.

The elections of 1992 and 1994 saw all 70 members elected from communal constituencies; this system was widely resented by many Indo-Fijians, who complained that only 27 seats were allocated to them as opposed to 37 to ethnic Fijians, despite the near equality of their numbers at that time.  A further 5 seats were allocated to minority groups.

A constitutional review in 1997 introduced a new system, with 71 members.  25 were elected by universal suffrage from Open constituencies ("open" meaning that the franchise was open to all locally resident Fijian citizens, irrespective of their ethnic background), with the remaining 46 elected from communal constituencies, with 23 seats reserved for ethnic Fijians, 19 for Indo-Fijians, 1 for Rotuman Islanders, and 3 for "General Electors" – Europeans, Chinese, Banaban Islanders, and other minorities.  Every Fijian citizen eligible to vote thus had two votes – one for an open electorate, and one for a communal electorate.  The system remained controversial, however.

The open constituencies differed from the former national constituencies in that while both comprised all registered voters on a common voters' roll, regardless of race, the open constituencies might be contested by members of any ethnic group whereas the national constituencies were ethnically allocated.

Organization 
At its first session following a general election, the House of Representatives would elect a Speaker and a Deputy Speaker.  With a view to ensuring impartiality, the Speaker was not allowed to be a member of the House, though he was required to qualify for membership.  The Deputy Speaker, however, was elected from among members of the House.

Latest election

Speaker and Deputy Speaker

Open Electorates

Communal Electorates (Fijian)

Communal Electorates (Indo-Fijian)

Communal Electorate (Rotuman)

Communal Electorates (General Electors)

See also 
 Speaker of the House of Representatives of Fiji

External links 
 Official Website of the Parliament of Fiji
 House of Representatives

1970 establishments in Fiji
2013 disestablishments in Fiji
Fiji
Government of Fiji
Fiji, House of Representatives
Politics of Fiji
Political organisations based in Fiji